"Thunder" is a song recorded by English boy band East 17, released as the first single from their third album, Up All Night (1995), on 23 October 1995. It achieved success in many countries, including Belgium (Wallonia), Germany, Ireland, Norway, Scotland, Switzerland and the UK, where it was a top-10 hit.

Critical reception
British magazine Music Week rated the song three out of five, writing, "A bland, lyrically-lacking rehash of all the elements which has made East 17 so successful. But it's catchy enough to create a stir."

Track listings
 CD single
 "Thunder" (Radio Edit) – 4:16
 "E-17 - Overture Medley" * (Live Steam Tour '95) – 9:28

 CD maxi
 "Thunder" (Radio Edit)
 "E-17 - Overture Medley" (Live Steam Tour '95)
 "Thunder" (Video Mix)
 "Thunder" (Lightning Mix)

 Cassette
 "Thunder" (Radio Edit) – 4:16
 "E-17 - Overture Medley" * (Live Steam Tour '95) – 9:28

* Contains "Let It Rain", "Stay Another Day", "House of Love", "Gold", "It's Alright", "Be There"

Credits
 Written by Anthony Mortimer
 Artwork by E.17/Form
 Photography of the band by Lawrence Watson
 Photography of the Cloud by Comstock, Inc.

Charts and certifications

Weekly charts

Year-end charts

Certifications

References

1994 songs
1995 singles
East 17 songs
Songs written by Tony Mortimer